Mattia Altobelli (born 14 January 1995) is an Italian footballer who plays for Vastese Calcio 1902.

Biography
Born in Termoli, Molise region, Altobelli started his career at Abruzzese club Pescara. Altobelli was a player of the under-15 team in 2009–10 season, under-17 football team in 2010–11 season and 2011–12 season as well as from 2012 to 2014 a player of the reserve team. In January 2014 he was signed by Serie D club Darfo Boario. In summer 2014 he received call-up for the first team of Pescara. However, before the closure of the transfer window, he was signed by Foggia in a temporary deal.

On 21 July 2015 Altobelli was signed by Maceratese in a temporary deal.

On 27 June 2016 he joined Teramo outright in a 3-year deal. He wore number 5 shirt for the team. He left the club in the summer 2019. On 16 November 2019, Altobelli joined Serie D club Vastese Calcio 1902.

References

1995 births
Sportspeople from the Province of Campobasso
Footballers from Molise
Living people
Italian footballers
Association football central defenders
Delfino Pescara 1936 players
U.S. Darfo Boario S.S.D. players
Calcio Foggia 1920 players
S.S. Teramo Calcio players
Siracusa Calcio players
Vastese Calcio 1902 players
Serie C players
Serie D players